Ilex tarapotina is a species of holly used in northern Peru to make a special type of maté known as “té o’ maté” which is said to produce unknown effects.

References

tarapotina
Flora of Peru
Plants described in 1901